Fromia hemiopla, common name armoured sea star, is a species of marine starfish belonging to the family Goniasteridae, .

References 

hemiopla
Animals described in 1913